Kaarlo Juho Ståhlberg (28 January 1865 – 22 September 1952) was a Finnish jurist and academic, which was one of the most important pioneers of republicanism in the country. He was the first president of Finland (1919–1925) and a liberal nationalist.

Ståhlberg was an important figure in the years of the Finland's independence and constitution, driving his Republican program through adversity. As a jurist, he anchored the state in liberal democracy, guarded the fragile germ of the rule of law, and embarked on internal reforms. In implementing the form of government of 1919, Ståhlberg piloted an independent Finland towards acting in world politics; in presidential-led foreign and security policy, he relied on international law and diplomacy.

It was only after the opening of private archives of President J. K. Paasikivi that it was realized that Ståhlberg had a very significant political role as a “éminence grise” until his death. He was asked for advice and opinions, which were also followed. Paasikivi highly valued Ståhlberg, and even described his predecessor in exaggerated words: “Ståhlberg was a man who never made mistakes”.

Biography

Early life

Ståhlberg was born in Suomussalmi, in the Kainuu region of the Grand Duchy of Finland, back when Finland was part of the Russian Empire. He was the second child of Johan (Janne) Gabriel Ståhlberg, an assistant pastor, and Amanda Gustafa Castrén. On both sides of his family, Ståhlberg's male forebears had been Lutheran clergymen. He was christened Carl Johan, but later Finnicized his forenames to Kaarlo Juho, as did most Fennomans (i.e. the supporters of Finnish language and culture instead of Swedish).

Ståhlberg and his family lived in Lahti, where he also went for grammar school. Ståhlberg's father died when he was a boy, leaving his family in a difficult financial position. The family moved to Oulu, where the children entered school. Kaarlo's mother Amanda worked to support the family until her death in 1879. Ståhlberg's family had always spoken and supported the Finnish language, and the young Ståhlberg was enrolled in Oulu's private Finnish lycee, where he would excel, and was the primus of his class. In 1889 he graduated as a Bachelor of Arts in Law from the University of Helsinki. He gained his Doctorate in Law in 1893.

Career as academic and civil servant
Ståhlberg soon began a very long career as the presenter and planner of the Senate's legislation, during the period when Finland was a Russian Grand Duchy. He was a "constitutionalist" - supporting the already existing Finnish constitutional framework and constitutional legislative policies, including legislative resistance, against the attempted Russification of Finland. He also came to support the call for women's suffrage, and had a moderate line on Prohibition.

Ståhlberg served as secretary of the Diet of Finland's finance committee in 1891 before being appointed as an assistant professor of Administrative Law and Economics at the University of Helsinki in 1894. It was at this time that he began his active involvement in politics, becoming a member of the Young Finnish Party.

In 1893, Ståhlberg married his first wife, Hedvig Irene Wåhlberg (1869–1917). They had six children together: Kaarlo (1894–1977), Aino (1895–1974),  Elli (1899–1986), Aune (1901–1967), Juho (1907–1973), and Kyllikki (1908–1994).

In 1898, Ståhlberg was appointed as Protocol Secretary for the Senate's civil affairs subdepartment. This was the second-highest Rapporteur position in the Finnish government. This appointment to a senior position in the Finnish administration was approved by the new Governor General of Finland, Nikolai Bobrikov, whose term in office saw the beginning of the period of Russification, and whose policies represented all that the constitutionalist Ståhlberg was opposed to. Ståhlberg was elected in 1901 as a member of Helsinki City Council, serving until 1903. In 1902, he was dismissed as Protocol Secretary, due to his strict legalist views, and his opposition to legislation on compulsory military service.

Career as politician
Ståhlberg participated in the Diet of Finland (1904–1905) as a member of the Estate of Burgesses. In 1905, he was appointed as a Senator in the newly formed Senate of Leo Mechelin, with responsibility for trade and industry. One of the most important tasks facing the new constitutionalist Senate was to consider proposals for the reform of the Diet of Finland and, although initially sceptical about some of the proposal, Ståhlberg played a role in the drafting of the legislation which created the Parliament of Finland. Ståhlberg resigned from the Senate in 1907, due to Parliament's rejection of a Senate bill on the prohibition of alcohol.

The following year he resumed his academic career and was appointed as Professor of Administrative Law at the University of Helsinki, a position he retained until 1918. During his time in that post he wrote his most influential piece of work, "Finnish administrative law, volumes I & II." He also remained active in politics, being elected to the central committee of the Young Finnish Party. In 1908, Ståhlberg was elected as a member of Parliament for the Southern Häme constituency, which he represented until 1910. He also served as a member for the Southern Oulu constituency from 1913 until his appointment as President of the Supreme Administrative Court in 1918. Ståhlberg also served as Speaker of the Parliament in 1914.

After the February Revolution in 1917, Ståhlberg was backed by the majority of the non-socialists members of Parliament as a candidate to become Vice-Chairman of the Economic Department of the Senate. However, he did not receive the support of the Social Democrats, which he had made a precondition of his being elected. Instead, the Social Democrat Oskari Tokoi was elected, with Ståhlberg being appointed as chairman of the Constitutional Council. This body had been set up earlier to draw up plans for a new form of government for Finland, in light of the events surrounding the February Revolution and the abdication of Nicholas II as Emperor of Russia and Grand Duke of Finland.

The new form of government approved by the council was largely based on the 1772 Instrument of Government, dating from the period of Swedish rule. The proposed form of government was rejected by the Russian Provisional Government, and was then left largely forgotten for a time due to the confusion and urgency of the situation surrounding the October Revolution and the declaration of Finland's independence.

Architect of the Finnish constitution
After Finland gained its independence in December 1917, the Constitutional Committee drafted new proposals for a form of government of an independent Republic of Finland. As chairman of the council, Ståhlberg was involved in the drafting and re-drafting of constitutional proposals during 1918, when the impact of the Finnish Civil War, and debates between republicans and monarchists on the future constitution, all led to various proposals. His proposals would eventually be enacted as the Constitution of Finland in 1919. In 1918, Ståhlberg supported the idea of republic instead of a constitutional monarchy which was supported by more conservative victors of the civil war. Ståhlberg's appointment as the first President of the Supreme Administrative Court in 1918 meant that he relinquished his role as a member of Parliament, and was therefore not involved in the election by the Parliament of Prince Frederick Charles of Hesse as King of Finland in October of that year. As it became clear that Finland would be a republic, Stålberg also championed direct election of the President of Finland, but the Council of State chose the electoral college system, although the first President would be elected by Parliament.

First President of Finland

Ståhlberg emerged as a candidate for president, with the support of the newly formed National Progressive Party, of which he was a member, and the Agrarian League. In the 1919 Finnish presidential election, he was elected by Parliament as President of the Republic on 25 July 1919, defeating Carl Gustaf Mannerheim (the candidate supported by the National Coalition and Swedish People's parties) by 143 votes to 50.

Ståhlberg was inaugurated as the first President of the Republic on the following day, and reluctantly moved out of his home in Helsinki to take up residence in the Presidential Palace.

Ståhlberg had been a widower since 1917, but in 1920, as president, he married his second wife, Ester Hällström (1870–1950). He was also very formal and, due to his shyness, wrote everything he had to say in public beforehand. He also had a distaste for official occasions, and he did not like travel or state visits, which is why, despite invitations and exhortations, he made no visits abroad during his presidency and received only one guest, Estonian President Konstantin Päts in May 1922. The Estonian head of state's visit was the first official visit to independent Finland. Finland's Ambassador to Stockholm, Werner Söderhjelm, repeatedly offered Ståhlberg a visit to its western neighbor Sweden, but Ståhlberg maintained his position:The first official visit of the President of Finland abroad was made only by his successor, President L. K. Relander.

As the first President of the Republic, Ståhlberg had to form various presidential precedents and interpretations of how the office of President should be conducted. His term in office was also marked by a succession of short-lived governments. During his time as president, Ståhlberg nominated and appointed eight governments. These were mostly coalitions of the Agrarians and the National Progressive, National Coalition and Swedish People's parties, although Ståhlberg also appointed two caretaker governments.  Importantly, Ståhlberg generally supported all the governments that he nominated, although he also sometimes disagreed with them.
He forced Kyösti Kallio's first government to resign in January 1924, when he demanded early elections to restore the full membership of Parliament - 200 deputies - and Kallio disagreed.  The Parliament had lacked 27 deputies since August 1923, when the Communist deputies had been arrested on suspicions of treason.

Ståhlberg supported moderate social and economic reforms to make even the former Reds accept the democratic republic. He pardoned
most of the Red prisoners, despite the strong criticism that this aroused from many right-wing Finns, especially the White veterans
of the Civil War and several senior army officers.  He signed into law bills that gave the trade unions an equal power with the employers' organizations to negotiate labour contracts, a bill to improve the public care for the poor, and the Lex Kallio law which distributed land from the wealthy landowners to the former tenant farmers and other landless rural people.

In foreign policy Ståhlberg was markedly reserved towards Sweden, largely as a consequence of the Åland crisis, which marked the early years of his presidency. He was also cautious towards Germany, and generally unsuccessful in his attempts to establish closer contacts with Poland, the United Kingdom and France.

Post-presidential life

Ståhlberg did not seek re-election in 1925, finding his difficult term of office a great strain. He also believed that the right-wing and the monarchists would become more reconciled to the republic if he stepped down.  According to the longtime late Agrarian and Centrist politician Johannes Virolainen, he believed that the incumbent president was too much favoured over the other candidates while standing for re-election. He was offered the post of Chancellor of the University of Helsinki, but declined it, instead becoming a member of the government's Law Drafting Committee. He also served as a National Progressive member of Parliament again, as a member for the Uusimaa constituency from 1930 to 1933.

In 1930, activists from the right-wing Lapua Movement kidnapped him and his wife, attempting to send them to the Soviet Union, but the incident merely hastened the Lapua Movement's demise.

Ståhlberg was a National Progressive Party candidate in the 1931 Presidential election, eventually losing to Pehr Evind Svinhufvud by only two votes in the third ballot. He was also a candidate in the 1937 election, eventually finishing third.

In 1946, Ståhlberg retired and became the legal adviser of President J. K. Paasikivi.  Paasikivi often consulted Ståhlberg; for example, under the 1950 presidential election an emergency plan was planned to extend Paasikivi's term in parliament as president, which Ståhlberg condemned angrily in his letter to Paasikivi:Their last discussion occurred less than two weeks before Ståhlberg died. He died in 1952, and was buried in Helsinki's Hietaniemi cemetery with full honours.

Among Finnish Presidents, Ståhlberg has retained a remarkably impeccable reputation.  He is generally regarded as a moral and
principled defender of democracy and of the rule of law, and as the father of the Finnish Constitution.  His decision to voluntarily
give up the presidency is also generally speaking admired as a sign that he was not a power-hungry career politician.

Honours

Awards and decorations

  : Grand Cross of the Order of the White Rose (Finland)
  : Cross of Liberty (Estonia)
  : Order of the Three Stars

References

External links

 
 K. J. Ståhlberg in The Presidents of Finland
 

1865 births
1952 deaths
Academic staff of the University of Helsinki
People from Suomussalmi
People from Oulu Province (Grand Duchy of Finland)
Finnish Lutherans
Young Finnish Party politicians
National Progressive Party (Finland) politicians
Presidents of Finland
Finnish senators
Speakers of the Parliament of Finland
Members of the Parliament of Finland (1908–09)
Members of the Parliament of Finland (1909–10)
Members of the Parliament of Finland (1913–16)
Members of the Parliament of Finland (1916–17)
Members of the Parliament of Finland (1917–19)
Members of the Parliament of Finland (1930–33)
Kidnapped politicians
People of the Finnish Civil War (White side)
Finnish legal scholars
Liberalism
Burials at Hietaniemi Cemetery
University of Helsinki alumni